Yatabe (written:  or ) is a common Japanese surname. Notable people with the surname include:

, Japanese screenwriter, anime director and sound director
, Japanese rugby union player
, Japanese botanist

See also 
Yatabe Domain, a former feudal domain of Japan

Japanese-language surnames